Begum Viqar un Nisa (also known as Viqar un Nisa Noon or Viqarunnisa Noon; 1920 – 16 January 2000) was the Spouse of the Prime Minister of Pakistan from 1957 to 1958.

By profession, she was a social worker. She married 7th Pakistani Prime Minister Sir Feroz Khan Noon in 1945. She participated in the Pakistan Movement, which led to the creation of the Islamic Republic of Pakistan. Viqar was an Austrian by birth and origin, and her name at birth was Victoria Rekha.

Involvement with Pakistan Movement
After her marriage, she converted to Islam, and renamed herself from Victoria to Viqar un Nisa. The Noons left Delhi the same year after Sir Feroz Khan Noon resigned from the Indian Viceroy's cabinet, and moved to Lahore. Lady Noon had firsthand exposure to Pakistani politics and involved herself with local politics, becoming a member of the Punjab Provincial Women's Subcommittee, organizing rallies and processions for the Muslim League. During the Civil disobedience movement in Punjab, Lady Noon helped organize protests and demonstrations against the British-backed Malik Khizar Hayat Tiwana's cabinet, being arrested three times.

Accession of Gwadar
Viqar-un-Nisa Noon played a big role in accession of Gwadar to Pakistan. She reportedly worked hard in London in 1956 to get Gwadar for Pakistan through British PM and parliament's approval for British colony Oman to give custody to Pakistan. She visited Winston Churchill for lobbying at British parliament in 1956 for ' Gwadar port' to be given to Pakistan and get approval from House of Lords.

Social work
Following  the independence of Pakistan in 1947 and the mass transfer of people across the border, she engaged in ameliorating the refugee crisis, lending assistance to various refugee camps and committees. She was involved with the Red Cross and engaged herself in local social work. She helped found Viqar un Nisa College for Women, Rawalpindi, Pakistan and the Viqarunnisa Noon School and College, a famous school and college for girls in Dhaka, Bangladesh.

Later life
Her husband Feroz Khan Noon later became the first Governor of East Pakistan and ultimately the Prime Minister of Pakistan in 1957. After his death, she continued to be involved in social work activities, along with other prominent lady social workers of Pakistan, such as late Begum Mahmooda Salim Khan, Attiya Inayatullah and Begum Zari Sarfaraz; and remained a senior and executive member of such organisations as the Family Planning Association of Pakistan, Pakistan Red Crescent Society, the National Crafts Council of Pakistan and others.

For a brief while, she also remained Federal Minister for Tourism and Culture in the Government of Pakistan, during the regime of Muhammad Zia-ul-Haq. In her later life, she spent a great deal of her time at her cottage "Al-Feroz", in the hills near Abbottabad, Pakistan, and in scenic Islamabad, where she found creative solace to paint and write.

Awards and recognition
In 1959, she was awarded the Nishan-e-Imtiaz (Medal of Excellence) for her services to the nation by the Government of Pakistan.

Death
Viqar-un-Nisa Noon died on 16 January 2000, aged 79, in Islamabad after a prolonged illness.

According to the newspaper Dawn in January 2021, "GWADAR plays a pivotal role in the China-Pakistan Economic Corridor (CPEC), which is termed a game-changer that is bound to boost the national economy". Many  credit then-Prime Minister Feroz Khan Noon and his wife for making it possible.

Acknowledgment 

 Viqar un Nisa Noon Girls Higher Secondary Institute, Rawalpindi, Pakistan
 Nishan e Imtiaz, Pakistan
 Vicky Noon Educational Foundation
 Viqarunnisa Noon School & College, Dhaka, Bangladesh

References

External links
 Official website of the Viqarunnisa Noon School & College

1920 births
2000 deaths
Austrian emigrants to Pakistan
Spouses of prime ministers of Pakistan
Viqar
Pakistani social workers
Converts to Islam
Pakistan Muslim League politicians
Pakistan Movement activists
Austrian social workers
Women federal ministers of Pakistan
Austrian Muslims
Ambassadors of Pakistan to Portugal
Recipients of Nishan-e-Imtiaz
Wives of knights